Arutanga–Reureu–Nikaupara is a Cook Islands electoral division returning one member to the Cook Islands Parliament.  Its current representative is Tereapii Maki-Kavana, who has held the seat since 2018.

The electorate was created in 1981, when the Constitution Amendment (No. 9) Act 1980-1981 adjusted electorate boundaries and split the electorate of Aitutaki into three.

Members of Parliament for Arutanga-Reureu-Nikaupara
Unless otherwise stated, all MPs terms began and ended at general elections.

References

Cook Islands electorates